Nô may refer to:

 Noh, a form of Japanese musical drama
 Nô (film), a 1998 film which uses Noh theatre as a dramatic device

See also
 No (disambiguation)